Kintamani is a district (kecamatan), and a village within that district, on the western edge of the larger caldera wall of the Mount Batur (Gunung Batur) caldera in Bali, Indonesia.  It is on the same north–south road as Penelokan and has been used as a stopping place to view the Mount Batur region. Kintamani is also known for Pura Tuluk Biyu's 1,000-year-old "Rites of Peace" stone tablets and the Kintamani dog breed. It is situated next to Mount Batur.

Kintamani District covers a greater land area than the city of Denpasar at 366.9 km2, and it was home to 112,463 people at the 2020 Census, but the area is rural, with only 7,402 people in 2010 in the administrative village of 19.45 km2 which has grown up along the single main road. Altogether there are 48 villages (desa) in the district.

References

External links
 

Populated places in Bali
Tourist attractions in Bali
Bangli Regency